Karen Carlson is an American actress.

Life and career
Carlson was born in Shreveport, Louisiana, the daughter of Mr. and Mrs. M.W. Carlson. She was educated at C.E. Byrd High School and at the University of Arkansas, Fayetteville, where she was a member of Kappa Kappa Gamma and represented the university and the state of Arkansas in the 1964 Miss America Pageant, finishing first runner up to Vonda Kay Van Dyke.

Carlson started her career in Bob Hope and Phyllis Diller variety shows, Laugh In, and The Hollywood Palace. She also appeared in television series and films, including The Candidate (1972) with Robert Redford and The Octagon (1980) with Chuck Norris. On television, Carlson played Nancy Scotfield in ten episodes of the soap opera Dallas (1986) and Sarah Hallisey in twelve episodes of In the Heat of the Night. She was also a series regular in American Dream with Stephen Macht, The Yellow Rose with her first husband, David Soul, and Cybill Shepherd, and Two Marriages with Michael Murphy.

She was later cast as Mary Ellen in ABC's Here Come the Brides. She guest-starred in The Man from U.N.C.L.E. (1967), Mission: Impossible (1971), Bonanza (1973), Starsky and Hutch (1976–77) with David Soul, Centennial (1978), The Misadventures of Sheriff Lobo (1979), Hart to Hart  (1980), Hill Street Blues (1983), and Hotel (1987). Her last appearance was in the film Out of Ashes (2013). She has since turned her focus from acting to directing and screenwriting.

Personal life
Carlson was married to actor and co-star David Soul. They divorced and she later married musician Devin Payne. She had one child with Soul and two children with Payne.

Filmography

References

External links
 

Living people
Actresses from Louisiana
American film actresses
American television actresses
University of Arkansas alumni
Miss America 1960s delegates
Actors from Shreveport, Louisiana
20th-century American people
21st-century American women
Year of birth missing (living people)